Stereocilin is a protein that in humans is encoded by the STRC gene.

This gene encodes a protein that is associated with the hair bundle of the sensory hair cells in the inner ear. The hair bundle is composed of stiff microvilli called stereocilia and is involved with mechanoreception of sound waves. This gene is part of a tandem duplication on chromosome 15; the second copy is a pseudogene. Mutations in this gene cause autosomal recessive non-syndromic deafness.

References

Further reading